Education Through Music - Los Angeles is an independent 501(c)(3) organization founded in 2006 in Los Angeles in the United States. The group aims to provide and promote music education into the curricula of schools of low-income students in the Los Angeles and surrounding areas, in order to enhance students' academic performance and creative and general development.

The group works with inner-city elementary schools that are not able to develop or sustain school-wide music programs. ETM-LA provides under-served Los Angeles youth with weekly, yearlong music classes at no cost to the school. The goal is to combine music with all other academic subjects in order to reinforce learning and development in all areas, as well as encourage the school to embrace music as a core subject by involving all members of the school community. Currently, ETM-LA serves over 12,000 Los Angeles school children, including students with special needs, with weekly, yearlong music instruction in disciplines such as violin, cello, guitar, flute, chorus, and general music.

ETM-LA headquarters are located in Burbank, California and since its creation has been led by Executive Director Victoria Lanier. Education Through Music-Los Angeles is an affiliate music education program based on the "Education Through Music" (ETM) model, used since 1991 in New York City.

Shining Star award

ETM-LA issues a "Shining Star" award for excellence in music education. In 2016, the recipients were Ed Helms and Richard Meyer. The recipients for 2015 were Randy Spendlove and Asuncion Ojeda.

Partnerships

Since its establishment in 2006 ETM-LA has formed several partnerships with various organizations and individuals. In 2007, ETM-LA became an arts provider for the LAUSD Arts Community Partnership Network and the LA County Arts for All program. In December 2010, ETM-LA students participated and performed in an unprecedented event with Fox Glee's American Express project. ETM-LA has also partnered with Neutrogena and Global Giving. In June 2013, ETM-LA partnered with Women in Film to create their first Public Service Announcement.

ETM-LA has also worked to connect artists to their students. Some of these artists include Ed Helms, Michael Giacchino, Joe Kraemer, and Joshua Bell.

Benefit events

Celebrities who have performed for Education Through Music-LA’s benefit events include:
Johnny Mathis
Patti Austin
Ben Vereen
Justin Guarini
Gordon Goodwin's Big Phat Band
Lalah Hathaway
Patrice Rushen
Kate Flannery
The Lampshades
Nicola Benedetti
Ray Ushikubo

Expenses
Expenses from 2011-2012

References

External links
 Education Through Music-Los Angeles

Non-profit organizations based in Los Angeles
Music education organizations